Bondarzewia mesenterica (synonym: Bondarzewia montana) is a species of polypore fungus in the family Bondarzewiaceae. It was first described as Boletus mesentericus by Jacob Christian Schäffer in 1774. Hanns Kreisel transferred it to the genus Bondarzewia in 1984. The species is edible.

The species grows at the base of conifers, developing from a sclerotium. The caps are tomentose with brownish zones, fan-shaped, often overlapping and growing from a shared base. The flesh is whitish with a pleasant odour when fresh. The species affects tree bases and roots with a white rot.

References

External links

Edible fungi
Fungi described in 1774
Fungi of Europe
Fungi of North America
Russulales
Taxa named by Jacob Christian Schäffer